= Sengenya music =

Sengenya is a ceremonial dance of the Digo tribe who live mainly in the Kwale district on the coastal province of Kenya. It is primarily centered on a song and dance performance that takes place during the day and night. Sengenya is typified by the actual participation of the audience who are invited to do so when requested.

During its formative stage sengenya was characterised by four movements, and this has now descended to two movements. This was the result of two different rhythms generated from six drums. The corollary of this is the introduction of two new dance genres – i.e. goma and zandale – these were part of the original sengenya dance genre.

The word goma refers to one of the newly created dance movements and is a Duruma word denoting either drums or dance. The dance movement itself is referred to as duume bull. This is because of the vigorous nature and style of the dance movement. When goma was formed, it was supposed to be performed during nyeresa mwezi (the Giriama), lusinga (the Chonyi), hangaifu (the Duruma) and matanga ya pili (the Waswahili).

The essence of Goma dance is the expression of passing food and music to those who have died. This enables them to join their ancestors who died earlier before they are entirely forgotten. Goma dance indeed, can be performed in the absence of any funerals, but purely as a homage to their ancestors.

On the other hand the genre of Zandale dance, is performed by the Duruma, Giriama and the Digo tribes. An instrument called the Chivoti is played at the outset before the dance commences.

Goma dance is meant to give food and music to the dead on their way to join the earlier departed ancestors before they are completely forgotten. Goma dance can also be performed with no specific funeral at hand, but rather, as a heritage to honor the ancestors. Zandale dance, another new creation are performed by the Duruma, Giriama and the Digo. Chivoti is played as a prelude before dance is started.

The chivoti instrument is played early in the morning by the Vijana (the youth) to alert members of the community of the onset of dawn (mabarubaru or mahoho alume). This can also be denoted that the young boys were ready to take cattle to the grazing fields as they have finished milking the cows. This signified that the boys were proud to undertake their tasks regardless of the physical and mental attribute of their male adult counterparts – especially if they were tired.

After the introduction by chivoti (designed to alert the people), nzumari (a powerful musical medium designed to send messages) prevails in order to invite people, in particular, members of the dance troupe, to come and greet the audience. Soon after the whole ensemble glides in to denote the gentle commencement of the dance which picks up pace as the performance progresses and finally becomes more intense and moving.

Although sengenya dance genre is typically performed during wedding and funeral occasions, some of its movements such as mserego are typically only performed at wedding ceremonies.
